Zografakis is a Greek surname, which may refer to:

 Aristides Zografakis (1912–unknown), Greek chess player
 Dimitrios Zografakis (born 1978), Greek footballer
 Kimonas Zografakis (1918–2004), Greek partisan 

Greek-language surnames